The National Kendo Federation of Armenia, is the regulating body of kendo in Armenia, governed by the Armenian Olympic Committee. The headquarters of the federation is located in Yerevan.

About
Armenian kendo athletes participate in various international kendo championships, the Federation also hosts national level competitions.

In October 2018, the Kendo Federation took part in a Martial Arts Festival organized by the embassy of Japan in Yerevan.

In August 2019, the Federation participated in the 8th International Kendo Seminar, held in Tbilisi.

See also
 Geography of kendo
 Sport in Armenia

References

External links 
 National Kendo Federation of Armenia on Facebook

Sports governing bodies in Armenia
Kendo organizations